Christopher Rebrassé (born 2 October 1985) is a French professional boxer who held the European super-middleweight title in 2014.

Professional career
Rebrassé made his professional debut on 25 November 2006 against Arnold Gond, who also debuted. Their fight ended in a four-round points draw. In his third fight, on 23 March 2007, Rebrassé lost a six-round points decision to Jean Marc Ismael. Rebrassé went undefeated for his next fifteen fights until 12 March 2011, when he lost a ten-round unanimous decision (UD) to Rachid Jkitou. This was followed by a six-round majority draw against Parfait Tindani on 15 April.

On 23 November 2012, Rebrassé won his first major regional championship—the vacant European Union super-middleweight title—by defeating Andrea Di Luisa via seventh-round corner stoppage. In his next fight, on 8 June 2013, Rebrassé challenged for the vacant European super-middleweight title, but his fight against Mouhamed Ali Ndiaye ended in a controversial split draw. In their EBU-mandated rematch on 22 March 2014, Rebrassé won the aforementioned title by stopping Ndiaye in four rounds.

In his first defence of the title, on 20 September 2014, Rebrassé lost a UD to George Groves in the latter's native UK. The vacant WBC Silver super-middleweight title was also on the line. Rebrassé travelled to the UK again on 26 June 2015, this time to face undefeated prospect Callum Smith for another chance to win the vacant WBC Silver super-middleweight title. Smith won a wide UD.

Professional boxing record

References

External links
 (archived)

Super-middleweight boxers
Living people
1985 births
French male boxers
European Boxing Union champions
People from Levallois-Perret
Sportspeople from Hauts-de-Seine